The men's fighting −85 kg competition in ju-jitsu at the 2009 World Games took place on 21 July 2009 at the National Sun Yat-Sen University Gymnasium in Kaohsiung, Taiwan.

Competition format
A total of 8 athletes entered the competition. They fought in stepladder system.

Results

Gold medal bracket

Bronze medal bracket

References

External links
 Results on IWGA website

Ju-jitsu at the 2009 World Games